Baron  was a Japanese politician and cabinet minister in the pre-war government of the Empire of Japan. He was also the 8th Japanese Governor-General of Taiwan from October 1919 to September 1923, and the first civilian to hold that position. Den was also a co-founder of Kaishinsha Motorcar Works, a predecessor to present-day Nissan and the original manufacturer of Datsun automobiles.

Biography 
Den was born in Tanba-Kaibara Domain, located in Hikami District of Tanba Province (part of the modern-day city of Tanba, Hyōgo), where his father was a village headman (nanushi). After the Meiji Restoration, he sought his fortune in Kumamoto Prefecture (1874), followed by Aichi Prefecture in 1875. Entering service of the police department, he was subsequently assigned to Kōchi Prefecture, Kanagawa Prefecture and Saitama Prefecture. Around 1890, he came to the attention of Communications Minister Gotō Shōjirō, who recruited him into the central bureaucracy of the Meiji government. He rose to the position of vice minister, and concurrently served on the board of governors of the Japanese Government Railways. In 1898, he resigned from government service to accept an appointment as president of the Kansai Railway Company.

He returned to government service in 1900 as Director of the Administration Bureau of the Communications Ministry, but resigned again only a year later to run for election to the Lower House of the Diet of Japan under the sponsorship of Itō Hirobumi and the Rikken Seiyūkai political party.  He served for two non-consecutive terms, returning each time to a senior post within the Ministry of Communications. In 1906, he was appointed to the House of Peers, and the following year was made a baron (danshaku) within the kazoku peerage system. In politics, he became closely aligned with the faction under the conservative genrō, Yamagata Aritomo, but later broke with Yamagata over issues pertaining to the Siemens scandal.

Den was also one of the founders of the Kaishinsha Motorcar Works in 1914. The "D" in the company acronym "DAT" was from "Den". Later changed to "Datsun", the company was acquired by the Nissan zaibatsu in the 1930s.

From 1916 to 1918, under Prime Minister Terauchi Masatake, Den was appointed Minister of Communications. During this period, he expressed concerns over the dominance of the United States and Great Britain over the new League of Nations, which contributed to an "encirclement" of Japan.
In 1919, Den was appointed Governor-General of Taiwan, the first civilian to be appointed to that post.  As Governor-General, he promoted new policies of social and political assimilation, wherein discriminatory laws in education were repealed. Several major reforms were carried out during Den's tenure, including various administrative reforms, expansion of the public education system, reduction of police involvement in local administration, construction of the Chanan Reservoir, and the legalization of Japanese-Taiwanese intermarriage.  Den’s stated goal was that the Taiwanese populace was to eventually enjoy the same political rights as the Japanese in the Home Islands, and that the Taiwanese would be assimilated into normal Japanese society. Business laws were eased to allow Taiwanese entrepreneurs to complete with Japanese, and several Taiwanese-owned newspapers were established. Under his tenure, then Crown Prince Hirohito made a state visit to Taiwan.

Following the 1923 Great Kantō earthquake, Den was recalled to Japan, and asked to take the posts of Minister of Justice and Minister of Agriculture and Commerce in the 2nd  Yamamoto Gonnohyōe administration. Together with Home Minister Gotō Shimpei, he laid the foundations for the reconstruction of Tokyo after the disaster. However, along with the rest of the cabinet, he was forced to resign in the aftermath of the Toranomon Incident. After 1925, he served as a member of the Privy Council. Den died of complications following an Intracranial hemorrhage in 1930 at his home in Setagaya, Tokyo. His grave is at the Tama Cemetery in Fuchū, Tokyo.

Den kept a detailed diary from 1906 to his death in 1930, which forms an important source document for the history of politics during the Taishō period of Japanese history.

Awards and decorations

Japanese

Peerages and titles
 Baron (21 September 1907)

Decorations
 Grand Cordon of the Order of the Sacred Treasure (25 December 1919)
 Grand Cordon of the Order of the Rising Sun (1 November 1920)
 Grand Cordon of the Order of the Paulownia Flowers (16 November 1930; posthumous)

Order of precedence
 Fourth rank (28 February 1898)
 Third rank (30 September 1916)
 Second rank (1 April 1930)

Foreign
 France: Officer of the Legion d'Honneur (12 April 1894)
 Denmark: Commander of the Order of the Dannebrog (20 January 1897)
 Austria-Hungary: Knight Second Class of the Order of the Iron Crown (28 May 1897)
 Ottoman Empire: Order of the Medjidie, 2nd Class (26 August 1897)

See also
 Taiwan under Japanese rule

References

External links

National Diet Library Bio and Photo

Notes 

1855 births
1930 deaths
Kazoku
Politicians from Hyōgo Prefecture
Rikken Seiyūkai politicians
Government ministers of Japan
Governors-General of Taiwan
Members of the House of Representatives (Empire of Japan)
Members of the House of Peers (Japan)
Recipients of the Order of the Rising Sun
Commanders of the Order of the Dannebrog
Japanese founders of automobile manufacturers
Japanese automotive pioneers
Nissan people